Urban Cowboy: Original Motion Picture Soundtrack is the soundtrack to the 1980 film Urban Cowboy. It spawned numerous Top 10 Billboard Country Singles, such as #1 "Lookin' for Love" by Johnny Lee, #1 "Stand by Me" by Mickey Gilley, #3 (AC chart) "Look What You've Done to Me" by Boz Scaggs, #1 "Could I Have This Dance" by Anne Murray, and #4 "Love the World Away" by Kenny Rogers. It also included songs that were hits from earlier years such as #1 "The Devil Went Down to Georgia" by the Charlie Daniels Band and "Lyin' Eyes" by the Eagles.  The film is said to have started the 1980s boom in pop-country music known as the "Urban Cowboy Movement" also known as Neo-Country or Hill Boogie. In December 2018 the soundtrack was certified triple platinum by the RIAA for sales of three million copies.

Initially released as a double LP in 1980, the album was re-released on CD in 1995.

Track listing

Chart performance

Chart singles

References 

1980 soundtrack albums
Romance film soundtracks
Western  film soundtracks
Asylum Records soundtracks